Cromlech is an area in the  community of Mechell, Ynys Môn, Wales, which is 143.3 miles (230.6 km) from Cardiff and 224.6 miles (361.4 km) from London.

References

See also
List of localities in Wales by population

Villages in Anglesey